Brandon William Convery (born February 4, 1974) is a Canadian former professional ice hockey player who played briefly in the NHL with the Toronto Maple Leafs, Vancouver Canucks, and Los Angeles Kings. He played center and shot right-handed.

Playing career
Convery began his career with the Sudbury Wolves of the OHL. For the 1991–1992 season Convery scored 40 goals in 44 games. His stellar play caught the eye of NHL scouts and he was drafted in the 1st round, 8th overall by the Toronto Maple Leafs in the 1992 NHL Entry Draft. After being drafted Convery returned to the OHL for the majority of the 1992–1993 season and also made his pro debut, appearing in 3 games with the St. John's Maple Leafs of the AHL.

Following another full season in the OHL, Convery played the 1994–1995 season with St. John's, scoring 71 points in 76 games. The following season Convery made his NHL debut with the Toronto Maple Leafs, appearing in 11 games and scoring 7 points. The 1996–1997 season saw Convery play 39 games with the Maple Leafs, a career high. He played the majority of the 1997–1998 season with St. John's before being traded to the Vancouver Canucks, appearing in 7 games. The following season Convery spent most of the year in the minors but played in 12 games with the Canucks. He was then placed on waivers and picked up by the Los Angeles Kings, playing in 3 games with the Kings. This would prove to be the last time Convery would play in the NHL. Convery then played for 4 years in Switzerland and 1 year in Sweden before retiring in 2004.

Career statistics

Regular season and playoffs

International

External links
 

1974 births
Living people
Canadian ice hockey centres
EHC Basel players
EHC Kloten players
HC Ajoie players
HC Lugano players
Ice hockey people from Ontario
Long Beach Ice Dogs (IHL) players
Los Angeles Kings players
National Hockey League first-round draft picks
St. John's Maple Leafs players
Sportspeople from Kingston, Ontario
Springfield Falcons players
Sudbury Wolves players
Toronto Maple Leafs draft picks
Toronto Maple Leafs players
Vancouver Canucks players